Nigel Benn vs. Chris Eubank was a series of two professional boxing matches which took place on 18 November 1990 and 9 October 1993. Both Benn and Eubank fought at middleweight and super middleweight around the same time in 1985–97, and became rivals on both the domestic and world boxing scene. Benn won his first 22 consecutive bouts by knockout, earning the moniker 'the Dark Destroyer'. Eubank was the cocky, flamboyant upstart who began calling out Benn after his tenth bout. The rivalry grew, with both men swearing that they would knock the other man out. The British public began to demand the fight to be made. 

Benn, having lost to Michael Watson, began to rebuild in America, winning the WBO middleweight title by knocking out Doug DeWitt. He then savaged Iran Barkley within one round in his first defence. Benn then agreed to meet Eubank with his title on the line, which set up the first fight. A rematch was held three years later.

The Hate Game, a book documenting this boxing rivalry, written by Ben Dirs, was published in 2013.

First fight

Once Benn had agreed to the first fight with Eubank, his entourage began plotting ways to demoralise Eubank and 'even things up'. They decided to sabotage his entrance music. As Eubank made his ring walk to the sound of Tina Turner's 'Simply the Best' (his ring moniker), the record suddenly stopped. Eubank ignored this, and made his way to the ring apron and vaulted to the rope as per usual. The bell then rang to begin the fight.

Eubank ran out sideways before turning and striking Benn with a right cross, clearly hoping for a surprise knockout. Benn stalked the challenger with pace, and the opening rounds are remembered for their lack of jabs or range finding punches. In the fourth round, Eubank took a ferocious right uppercut to the chin when breaking from a clinch. The blow caused him to bite his tongue, leaving a severe gash which led to copious amounts of blood being swallowed. Eubank hid this evidence from his corner, afraid of a doctor stoppage. Benn's eye was swollen shut by the fifth round, and in the sixth Eubank began throwing shots at Benn who was covering up on the ropes. Benn caught Eubank with a low blow, and with no points deducted used his advantage by pounding Eubank's body. Eubank fought back in the seventh, and with scores fairly even the fighters began the eighth round.

A more wary Benn now sought to catch Eubank with flashing overhand shots followed by short hooks. Eubank was trapped in the corner when an overhand right caught him on top of the head, knocking him down. He was up quickly, claiming it was a slip, but took the eight count regardless from Richard Steele. Eubank finished the round strongly and posed and preened between the rounds. The ninth was an even round until Eubank missed with a right and Benn caught him with a left hook which landed on the unbalanced Eubank's rear, sending him down. Standing up, Eubank circled Benn before releasing a left right combination, and a left hook which staggered Benn. Benn survived the flurry and clinched, but a straight right from Eubank sent him into a corner, and Steele stepped in to end the flurry with five seconds left of round nine, ending what he called; "The most dramatic fight I've ever refereed".

Eubank would defend his new title three times, relinquishing to contest the vacant WBO super middleweight title against the ill-fated Michael Watson, who after winning eight of eleven rounds fell into a coma after a Eubank uppercut at the end of round 11, before the subsequent referee stoppage twenty seconds into round 12. Benn, who had also moved up to super middleweight, won the WBC super middleweight title in Italy, beating Mauro Galvano. With both men champions in the same weight division, a unification fight and three-year anticipated rematch was arranged by Don King for 9 October 1993.

|  style="width:36%; text-align:center;"| Preceded byKO1 Iran Barkley 
|  style="width:28%; text-align:center;"| Nigel Benn's bouts18 November 1990
|  style="width:36%; text-align:center;"| Succeeded byKO7 Robbie Sims
|-
|  style="width:36%; text-align:center;"| Preceded byKO1 Reginaldo Dos Santos 
|  style="width:28%; text-align:center;"| Chris Eubank's bouts18 November 1990
|  style="width:36%; text-align:center;"| Succeeded byTW10 Dan Sherry

Second fight

Over 42,000 crammed Old Trafford for this bout, which was watched by half a billion people worldwide. Don King's contract stipulated that not only would the winner join his stable of fighters, but also the loser.

This time Eubank's ring walk went off without a hitch, commentator Reg Gutteridge making the classic call when Eubank performed his customary vault over the ropes into the ring, saying “The ego has landed". The fight itself did not quite reach the heights of brutality of the first, as neither man was as badly hurt. However, there were flurries of punches at the ends of the rounds, with both boxers trying to claim the rounds knowing that there was more chance of the fight lasting the distance as the bout progressed. One such exchange saw Benn in a corner knocked through the ropes, though Eubank used his body as well and Benn was not badly hurt. The final round was thrilling, with both boxers told they needed it to win. Most boxing experts agree that this was a truly classic round, Gutteridge referring to the two 'magnificent warriors' at its climax.

The final scores were 115–113 Eubank, 114–113 Benn, and 114–114. The bout was declared a draw – Benn retained his WBC belt, Eubank his WBO championship. Astonishingly, Don King had not written the event of a draw into the contract, and as a result, neither fighter was contractually bound to join him.

The pair never fought again, despite a £6 million bout at Wembley stadium being touted for Eubank's eight-fight Sky deal. Benn faced Gerald McClellan, pound-for-pound one of the most devastating fighters of the 90s, and his career paralleled Eubank's when McClellan was paralyzed as a result of this bout. Benn was finished mentally and almost physically after this violent war and lost first his title then twice more to Steve Collins, who magnanimously claimed afterward that Benn was the greatest British boxer ever, and wished he could have fought him at his prime.

Eubank too lost his title and unbeaten record, also to Collins by a split decision. He retired and came out of retirement to face a young Joe Calzaghe, who beat him on points. He fought for the WBO cruiserweight title, losing another split decision to Carl Thompson, and the rematch when, ahead on points, the doctor stopped the fight due to Eubank's swollen eye. This time, he retired for good.

On the ITV documentary Best Ever Big Fight Live, former world champion Duke McKenzie said of the Benn–Eubank rivalry: "It may never be rivaled". Barry McGuigan agreed, saying; "There was real antipathy and ill-will there. But what fights, what fights." The legacy of the feud was summed up with the first fight being shown, and given the moniker; "A war to end all wars".

Legacy
Both Nigel Benn's son and Chris Eubank's son are expected to fight in 2022. Chris Eubank Jr. vs Conor Benn was originally supposed to be held on 08 October 2022, however, was postponed after Benn tested positive in a random drug test from UKAD.  Eddie Hearn stated that the fight has been built on the  “legacy” of the two brutal bouts between Eubank Sr and Benn Sr in the 1990s.

References

https://web.archive.org/web/20110629141823/http://www.100greatblackbritons.com/bios/nigel_benn-chris_eubanks
http://boxing-forum.co.uk/phpBB2/viewtopic.php?p=7958& – 59k
http://www.eastsideboxing.com/news/Benn-Eubank-Watson.php

Boxing matches
1990 in boxing
1993 in boxing
Boxing in England
Sport in Birmingham, West Midlands
Sport in Trafford
1990 in English sport
1993 in English sport
1990s in Birmingham, West Midlands
November 1990 sports events in the United Kingdom
October 1993 sports events in the United Kingdom